Puss in Boots is a 2011 American computer-animated adventure comedy film produced by DreamWorks Animation and distributed by Paramount Pictures. It is a spin-off of the Shrek film series and its fifth installment, rather than an adaptation of the fairytale "Puss in Boots". The film was directed by Chris Miller with a screenplay by Tom Wheeler from a story by Brian Lynch, Will Davies, and Wheeler, based on the character from Shrek 2 (2004) and inspired from the Puss in Boots fairy tale. It stars Antonio Banderas (reprising his voice role as Puss in Boots), alongside Salma Hayek, Zach Galifianakis, Billy Bob Thornton, and Amy Sedaris. The film follows the origin story of Puss in Boots (Banderas) on his adventures years before the events of Shrek 2. Accompanied by his friends, Humpty Dumpty (Galifianakis) and Kitty Softpaws (Hayek), Puss is pitted against Jack and Jill (Thornton and Sedaris), two murderous outlaws, for ownership of three legendary magical beans that lead to a great fortune of Golden Eggs from the Great Terror, a gigantic Goose.

Development began following the release of Shrek 2 in 2004. Originally titled Puss in Boots: The Story of an Ogre Killer, it was announced as a direct-to-video film to be released in 2008. In October 2006, the film was re-slated as a theatrical release due to market conditions and DreamWorks Animation's realization that the Puss character deserved more, with Shrek the Third (2007) director Miller joining the project as the director. Guillermo del Toro signed as an executive producer in September 2010. This was the first film from DreamWorks Animation to be partly made in India with a Bangalore studio owned by Technicolor, which had mainly worked on TV specials and DVD bonus material, spending six months animating three major scenes in the film.

Puss in Boots had its world premiere on October 16, 2011, aboard the Royal Caribbean International's cruise ship Allure of the Seas, docked in Fort Lauderdale, Florida at the time, and was released in theaters on October 28, 2011 in 2D, Digital 3D and IMAX 3D formats. Puss in Boots received positive reviews from critics and was a box office success, grossing $555 million on a production budget of $130 million. At the 84th Academy Awards, the film was nominated for Best Animated Feature.

A television series spin-off from the film titled The Adventures of Puss in Boots premiered on Netflix in January 2015 and concluded in January 2018 after six seasons. A sequel set after the Shrek films, titled Puss in Boots: The Last Wish, was released on December 21, 2022.

Plot
Puss in Boots is a Spanish-speaking, anthropomorphic cat named for his signature pair of boots. A fugitive on the run from the law, Puss is seeking to restore his lost honor. He learns that the murderous outlaw couple Jack and Jill have the magic beans he has long sought, which can lead him to a giant's castle known by legend to contain valuable golden goose eggs. When Puss attempts to steal the beans at their hideout, a female cat named Kitty Softpaws interrupts. She was hired to steal them as well by Humpty Alexander Dumpty, a talking egg and long-estranged childhood friend of Puss from the orphanage where they both were raised. Puss tells Kitty his origin story and how he felt betrayed by Humpty, who tricked Puss into committing a bank robbery in his hometown of San Ricardo. Puss has been on the run ever since. Humpty eventually convinces Puss to join them in finding the beans and retrieving the golden eggs.

Puss and Kitty's relationship turns romantic and, despite Puss's initial grudge against Humpty, he slowly warms up to him, as the trio steals the beans from Jack and Jill and plants them in the desert. They ride the beanstalk into the clouds and enter the giant's castle, where Humpty reveals to Puss that although the giant died a long time ago, they must still avoid the "Great Terror" who guards the golden eggs. They soon realize the golden eggs are too heavy, and decide to steal the golden gosling after witnessing it lay miniature golden eggs. They manage to escape the castle and cut down the beanstalk. After celebrating, the group is ambushed by Jack and Jill, and Puss is knocked unconscious.

When he wakes, Puss assumes Humpty and Kitty were kidnapped and tracks Jack and Jill's wagon back to San Ricardo. There, he learns that the kidnapping was staged. Jack, Jill, and Kitty are all working for Humpty, who is seeking revenge against Puss for abandoning him during the failed bank robbery. Puss is surrounded by the town's militia and turns himself in following pleas from his adoptive mother Imelda. As Puss is hauled away to prison, Humpty is celebrated as a hero for bringing the wealth of the golden eggs to the townspeople.

Puss meets Andy "Jack" Beanstalk in prison. Jack reveals that Humpty stole the beans from him when they shared a cell years ago, and warns Puss that the Great Terror is the Golden Goose herself, a gigantic bird who will stop at nothing to rescue her baby. Puss realizes that luring the Great Terror was Humpty's intention all along, hoping to destroy the town in revenge for his imprisonment and flee with the gosling in the chaos. Kitty frees Puss from prison and apologizes, revealing her feelings for him. He locates Humpty in time and convinces him to redeem himself by helping save the town from destruction. Using the gosling as bait, Puss and Humpty are able to lure the Golden Goose away from town. With Kitty's help, they also thwart Jack and Jill's attempt to steal the gosling during the chase. As they reach the outskirts of town, Humpty and the gosling are knocked off a collapsing bridge but manage to hang onto a rope that Puss grabs. When it becomes evident that Puss cannot save them both, Humpty sacrifices himself by letting go. After a fatal impact, Puss discovers that Humpty was a large golden egg underneath his shell. The Golden Goose is reunited with her gosling, and she takes Humpty's golden egg remains back to the giant's castle.

Despite being hailed a hero by the townspeople for saving San Ricardo, Puss is still a fugitive in the eyes of the militia. He reunites with Imelda, who expresses her pride and love for Puss before he flees with Kitty, who playfully steals his boots and runs off. In the epilogue, Jack and Jill are recovering from their injuries, Humpty's spirit is seen, in his normal form wearing a golden egg costume, dancing on the Great Terror’s back with her gosling, and Puss and Kitty share a kiss.

Voice cast

 Antonio Banderas as Puss in Boots, a cat fugitive from the law trying to restore his reputation as hero of San Ricardo.
 Salma Hayek as Kitty Softpaws, a street-savvy Tuxedo cat who is Puss' female counterpart and love interest.
 Zach Galifianakis as Humpty Alexander Dumpty, the mastermind who intends to retrieve the Golden Eggs from the one-of-a-kind Goose.
 Billy Bob Thornton and Amy Sedaris as Jack and Jill respectively, a murderous outlaw married couple who owns the three legendary magical beans.
 Constance Marie as Imelda, Puss' human adoptive mother
 Mike Mitchell as Andy "Jack" Beanstalk
 Guillermo del Toro as Commandante, the military leader of San Ricardo dispatched to capture Puss
 Chris Miller as Little Boy Blue, Friar Miller, Prison Guard, Manuel and Rafael

Production
The film had been in development since 2004, when Shrek 2 was released. Chris Miller, who worked as head of story in Shrek 2, was a big proponent of making a spin-off film centered on the Puss in Boots due to his love for the character and the intriguing story potential he had, given the adventures he mentions to have had in the film. As a Shrek 2 spin-off, it was initially planned for release in 2008 as a direct-to-video film, then titled Puss in Boots: The Story of an Ogre Killer. By October 2006, the film was re-slated as a theatrical release due to market conditions and DreamWorks Animation's realization that the Puss character deserved more. Miller was hired to direct the film immediately after directing Shrek the Third.

In September 2010, Guillermo del Toro signed on as executive producer. Having exited from The Hobbit, del Toro was invited by the crew to watch an early screening of the film, half animated and half storyboarded, which del Toro loved and asked them if he could be somehow involved in the production. Discussing del Toro, Miller stated, "We worked out a system for him to come in once every few months or whenever we had something new to show him. If we needed someone to bounce ideas off of, he was always there, and if we had a problem we were tackling, we'd get Guillermo on the red phone – our emergency phone – and ask him advice on what we should do with a certain character or scene. It was like having our own film school". Miller stated that del Toro was particularly involved in Humpty Dumpty's character design, suggesting to "make him more like da Vinci". It was del Toro's idea to make Humpty "an ingenious freak of nature" who builds contraptions such as a flying machine. Del Toro rewrote the ending to redeem the character and deepen his relationship with Puss – an unconventional conclusion for a family film. He helped design the fantasy elements of the giant's castle, as well as the architecture of the town, which he conceived as "an amalgam of Spain and Mexico".

During the film's production, the filmmakers struggled for a long time about including the Giant from "Jack and the Beanstalk", an English fairy tale from which the magic beans and the castle in the clouds were borrowed from. As the filmmakers had already figured out the Giant's world, the Giant itself was challenging for them. They wanted to depict him faithfully like the classic fairy tale legend giant, but despite how hard they tried to incorporate him into the story, his presence turned out to be predictable. In the end, it was decided to have the Giant killed off offscreen in order to subvert fairy tales’ expectations.

Antonio Banderas reprised his role as Puss in Boots from the Shrek films. According to Miller, the crew wanted to cast Zach Galifianakis, Billy Bob Thornton, Amy Sedaris and Salma Hayek early on during production. As Humpty Dumpty was Galifianakis' first voiceover role, he was allowed to improvise by the filmmakers. Similarly, Thornton enjoyed the experience of voicing Jack as he was looking to challenge himself with a role out of his comfort zone. Sedaris, with whom Miller had worked before with Shrek the Third, improvised most of her dialogue as Jill, giving almost fifty different versions of her scripted lines. Except for Puss, the film features new characters. Citing the co-writer, David H. Steinberg, "It doesn't overlap with Shrek at all. Partly that was done to tell an original Puss story, but partly because we didn't know what Shrek 4 were going to do with the characters and we couldn't write conflicting storylines." The film was teased in Shrek Forever After, when Shrek finally shuts the book titled "Shrek", and puts it away next to a book titled "Puss in Boots".

Puss in Boots is the first DreamWorks Animation film that was partly made in India. A Bangalore studio owned by Technicolor, which had mainly worked on TV specials and DVD bonus material, spent six months animating three major scenes in the film. The outsourcing had financial advantages, with 40% less labor costs than in the US, but the primary reason for outsourcing to India was lack of personnel, due to the studio producing as many as three films a year.

Music

Henry Jackman, the composer for Puss in Boots, utilized folk instruments of traditional Latin music. Inspired by Spanish composer Manuel de Falla, Jackman blended guitars and Latin percussion with an orchestral sound influenced by Claude Debussy and Maurice Ravel. Mexican guitar duo Rodrigo y Gabriela contributed to Jackman's score, and two of their songs, "Diablo Rojo" and "Hanuman", were included in the soundtrack. Lady Gaga's song "Americano" was also featured in the film. The soundtrack for the film, featuring the original score by Jackman, was released on October 26, 2011, by Sony Classical.

Release
Puss in Boots was originally set for release on November 4, 2011, but was instead pushed a week earlier to October 28, 2011. Anne Globe, head of worldwide marketing for DreamWorks Animation, said the decision to move the film's release date a week earlier was to attract parents and their children to see the film before other family-friendly films were released in November 2011.

The film was renamed Cat in Boots in the United Arab Emirates for officially unknown reasons, but it is suspected for religious and cultural reasons. According to the UAE's The National Media Council, which is responsible for censorship, the UAE didn't have any involvement in the rename and that "the decision to change the name had been made by the Hollywood studio and the movie distributors in the UAE." Consequently, since the film's distributor was based in the UAE, the same print was syndicated to all theaters throughout the Middle East. However, the name change was limited to the film's original theatrical run, as merchandise and later regional home media release retained the film's original title.

Puss in Boots had its world premiere on October 16, 2011, docking the Royal Caribbean International's cruise ship Allure of the Seas, docked in Fort Lauderdale, Florida at the time. It was theatrically released in the United States on October 28, 2011. The film was digitally re-mastered into IMAX 3D, and was released in 268 North American IMAX theaters and at least 47 IMAX theaters outside North America.

Home media
Puss in Boots was released on DVD, Blu-ray, and Blu-ray 3D on February 24, 2012. The movie was accompanied by a short animated film titled Puss in Boots: The Three Diablos. It grossed $70.4 million in home video sales and was the tenth best-selling title of 2012.

Another featured extra short is "Klepto Kitty"; a three-minute profile of Dusty the Klepto Kitty, a notorious cat in California who steals items from neighbors' yards, some of it captured on a night vision kitty-cam, hung around Dusty's neck by the Animal Planet network for their own documentary.

Reception

Box office
Puss in Boots grossed $149.2 million in the United States and Canada, and $405.7 million in other countries, for a worldwide total of $555 million. It was the eleventh highest-grossing film of 2011 and is also the third highest-grossing animated film that year behind Kung Fu Panda 2 ($665.7 million) and Cars 2 ($559.9 million).

In North America, Puss in Boots topped the box office on its opening day with $9.6 million. On its opening weekend, the film made $34.1 million, topping Saw IIIs record ($33.6 million) for the highest Halloween weekend opening ever. It retained first place during its second weekend, with $33.1 million, declining only 3%. By this point, it had the smallest decline of any non-holiday film, surpassing Twister.

Outside North America, on its opening weekend, it earned second place with $17.2 million. The film opened at #1 in both the UK with a weekend gross of £1.98 million ($3.1 million), and Australia, with $2.98 million. It topped the box office outside North America on its seventh weekend with $47.1 million from 40 countries. It ranks as the ninth highest-grossing film of 2011 outside North America. Its highest-grossing country after North America was Russia and the CIS ($50.6 million), followed by Germany ($33.9 million) and France and the Maghreb region ($33.2 million).

Critical response
The site's critical consensus reads, "It isn't deep or groundbreaking, but what it lacks in profundity, Puss in Boots more than makes up for with an abundance of wit, visual sparkle, and effervescent charm." Metacritic gave Puss in Boots a weighted average score of 65 out of 100 based on 24 critics, indicating "generally favorable reviews". CinemaScore polls reported that the average grade moviegoers gave the film was an "A−" on an A+ to F scale.

Todd McCarthy of The Hollywood Reporter gave the film a positive review, saying "Puss in Boots is a perfectly diverting romp that happens to showcase some of the best 3D work yet from a mainstream animated feature. Colorful, clever enough, free of cloying showbiz in-jokes, action-packed without being ridiculous about it and even well choreographed." Peter Debruge of Variety gave the film a positive review, saying "Puss' origin story could easily stand on its own -- a testament to clever writing on the part of its creative team and an irresistible central performance by Antonio Banderas." Christy Lemire of the Associated Press gave the film three out of four stars, saying "For quick, lively, family friendly entertainment, "Puss in Boots" works just fine, even in 3-D, which is integrated thoughtfully into the narrative and doesn't just feel like a gimmick." Bill Goodykoontz of The Arizona Republic gave the film three and a half stars out of five, saying "As good as Banderas and Hayek are together, Galifianakis is better, making Humpty-Dumpty, of all people, one of the more intriguing animated characters to come along in a while. He's a nice surprise." Moira MacDonald of The Seattle Times gave the film three out of four stars, saying "I left dreaming of a world in which cats could tango - and when's the last time a movie did that?" Marjorie Baumgarten of The Austin Chronicle gave the film three out of five stars, saying "The seductive interplay of Banderas and Hayek, the barely recognizable vocal contributions of Galifianakis, and the Southern backwoods speech of Thornton and Sedaris all keep us attuned to the events on the screen."

Owen Gleiberman of Entertainment Weekly gave the film a C, saying "In the Shrek films, the joke of Puss in Boots, with his trilled consonants and penchant for chest-puffing sword duels, is that no one this cuddly should try to be this dashing. But in Puss in Boots, that joke wears out its welcome in 15 minutes." Ty Burr of The Boston Globe gave the film three out of four stars, saying "Puss in Boots doesn't break any new ground in the storytelling department, and its reliance on go-go-go state-of-the-art action sequences grows wearying by the end, but the movie has a devilish wit that works for parent and child alike." Elizabeth Weitzman of the New York Daily News gave the film four out of five stars, saying "It's always a pleasure to find a family film that respects its audience all the way up the line." Colin Covert of the Star Tribune gave the film one and a half stars out of four, saying "Remember that toy where you yank a string and hear the sound of a barnyard animal? "Puss in Boots" has about half as much entertainment value." Olly Richards of Empire gave the film three out of five stars, saying "Like most kittens, it's not always perfectly behaved, but at least this new Puss adventure doesn't have you reaching for the cinematic spray bottle. And thank goodness the spin-off does nothing to neuter the charismatic cat's appeal." Stan Hall of The Oregonian gave the film a B, saying "Puss in Boots isn't particularly deep, nor does it take itself seriously -- it just wants to seek glory, win affection and cash in. Done, done and done."

Kenneth Turan of the Los Angeles Times gave the film four out of five stars, saying "Perhaps the most engaging thing about "Puss in Boots" is that it never takes itself too seriously." Stephen Holden of The New York Times gave the film three and a half stars out of five, saying "It is a cheerfully chaotic jumble of fairy tale and nursery rhyme characters parachuted into a Spanish storybook setting." Lou Lumenick of the New York Post gave the film one and a half stars out of four, saying "Basically, this toon is a tired riff on Sergio Leone's spaghetti Westerns, punctuated by more puns and cat jokes than you can shake a litter box at." Claudia Puig of USA Today gave the film three out of four stars, saying "With his impeccable comic timing and lyrical Spanish accent, Banderas' swashbuckling charmer is an undeniable treat." Michael O'Sullivan of The Washington Post gave the film three out of four stars, saying "Puss in Boots" proves there is at least one cat with multiple lives. The feature-length animated spinoff - a star turn for the popular "Shrek" supporting character voiced by Antonio Banderas - is almost shockingly good. And not just because a lot of you will approach it with lowered expectations." Stephen Whitty of the Newark Star-Ledger gave the film three out of four stars, saying "An almost purr-fect little film that even a dog owner can enjoy."

Joe Morgenstern of The Wall Street Journal gave the film a positive review, saying "Puss made his debut in "Shrek 2," then did time in the two decreasingly funny sequels. Now he's got a movie of his own, and not a moment too soon." Lisa Kennedy of The Denver Post gave the film three out of four stars, saying "It would overstate matters to say Puss in Boots leaves its cat holding the bag (we had to get that in). But it also leaves its hero awaiting a richer fable, one befitting his charms and his portrayer's talents." Anna Smith of Time Out gave the film three out of five stars, saying "Puss in Boots is uneven, but when it's on course, cat fans will be in heaven." Amy Biancolli of the Houston Chronicle gave the film three out of five stars, saying "Puss in Boots prances along on three basic truths. One, cats are funny. Two, vain Spanish cats in high-heeled musketeer boots are even funnier. Lastly, booted, vain Spanish cats voiced by a breathy Antonio Banderas are flat-out hilarious." Tasha Robinson of The A.V. Club gave the film a C+, saying "Puss In Boots makes a great theme-park ride, a thrill-a-minute feast for the eyes and the semicircular canals. But while the settings are impressively multidimensional, the characters are flatter than old-school cel drawings."

Accolades

Future

Television series

The film also spawned an animated series that premiered on Netflix on January 16, 2015. It aired 78 episodes across six seasons, with its final season released on the streaming service on January 26, 2018. The series is set before the events of the movie. Eric Bauza voices the titular character.

Sequel 

In February 2012, director Chris Miller stated that he would love to make a Puss in Boots sequel as the character was set up to have more fantastic, surreal and funnier adventures, but that they would first analyze how the audience reacted to the film and whether they would want a sequel. In November 2012, executive producer Guillermo del Toro said that they already did a couple of script drafts for a sequel, and that Miller wants to take Puss on an adventure to exotic places. In April 2014, Antonio Banderas, the voice of Puss, said that the work on the sequel had just begun. In June 2014, the movie was titled Puss in Boots 2: Nine Lives & 40 Thieves and was scheduled to be released on November 2, 2018. Two months later, it was moved one month to December 21, 2018. In January 2015, Puss in Boots 2 was removed from the release schedule following corporate restructuring and DreamWorks Animation's new policy to release two films a year. Two months later, Banderas said in an interview that the script was under restructuring, and that Shrek may appear in the film.

On November 6, 2018, it was announced by Variety that Chris Meledandri had been tasked to being one of the executive producers of both Shrek 5 and Puss in Boots 2, with the cast returning. In February 2019, Bob Persichetti, the head of story on the first film and a co-director of Spider-Man: Into the Spider-Verse (2018), signed on to direct the sequel. Latifa Ouaou, who produced the original Puss in Boots film, would oversee development of the sequel alongside Meledandri. In August 2020, the name Puss in Boots: The Last Wish had been trademarked by DreamWorks, revealing the new title of the sequel.

In March 2021, the film received a new release date of September 23, 2022, with DWA's parent company Universal Pictures now handling distribution. Persichetti and Ouaou were respectively replaced by Joel Crawford and Mark Swift as director and producer after having previously done so on The Croods: A New Age (2020), while Antonio Banderas was also confirmed to be reprising his role as Puss. The film's first trailer was released on March 15, 2022. Salma Hayek was later confirmed to reprise her role as Kitty Softpaws, while other cast members of the film will include Florence Pugh (as Goldilocks), Olivia Colman, Wagner Moura, Ray Winstone, John Mulaney, Da'Vine Joy Randolph, Harvey Guillén (as Perrito the Dog), Anthony Mendez, and Samson Kayo. In April 2022, the film's release date was further pushed to December 21, 2022.

Video games
 Puss in Boots, a video game based on the film, developed by Blitz Games, and published by THQ on October 25, 2011 for Xbox 360, PlayStation 3, Wii, and Nintendo DS. It features support for Kinect and PlayStation Move on the respective platforms.
 Fruit Ninja: Puss in Boots, a Puss in Boots-themed Fruit Ninja video game, which was released on October 20, 2011, on the iOS App Store, and was released for Android devices on November 28, 2011, on the Amazon Appstore.

References

External links
 
 
 

2011 films
2011 3D films
2011 computer-animated films
2010s American animated films
2011 action comedy films
2010s adventure comedy films
2010s fantasy adventure films
Animated crossover films
American computer-animated films
Animated films about cats
Fairy tale parody films
Film spin-offs
Films adapted into television shows
Films based on Puss in Boots
Films set in castles
Films set in Spain
Prequel films
Shrek films
DreamWorks Animation animated films
IMAX films
Paramount Pictures films
Paramount Pictures animated films
Films scored by Henry Jackman
3D animated films
2010s English-language films
American prequel films